Malus toringoides is a crabapple species in the family Rosaceae, with the common name cut-leaf crabapple.

The tree is endemic to mountain ranges of China, located within Shaanxi, Gansu, Ningxia, Qinghai and Sichuan Provinces.

Malus toringoides is a wild crabapple tree, and is sometimes used as a root stock in apple hybridizing.  It is a naturally occurring hybrid species with multiple ploidy levels.

References

toringoides
Crabapples
Endemic flora of China
Flora of Shaanxi
Flora of Gansu
Flora of Ningxia
Flora of Qinghai
Flora of Sichuan